Mostapha Laabid (born 29 March 1969) is a French politician, formerly of La République En Marche!. He was the French National Assembly deputy for Ille-et-Vilaine's 1st constituency from 21 June 2017 to 7 September 2021.

Laabid currently runs the Rennes chapter of Fondation Agir Contre l'Exclusion (Action Against Exclusion Foundation, or FACE), a private foundation which aims to combat employment discrimination.

In 2020 he was convicted of embezzlement.

References

1969 births
Living people
Deputies of the 15th National Assembly of the French Fifth Republic
La République En Marche! politicians
Politicians from Rennes
University of Rennes alumni
French people of Moroccan descent
French politicians convicted of crimes
Deputies of the 16th National Assembly of the French Fifth Republic